Ariel Maa (translation: "Ariel Mother") is a television talk show and travel program hosted by Sania Saeed and directed by Kamran Qureshi. The show was sponsored by Procter & Gamble. The Ariel team also did a social welfare service by presenting cheques to deserving mothers struggling to provide for their children.

The programme was telecast every Saturday on PTV between 2000–2002.

The concept
The program focused on hundreds of mothers nurturing their children, regardless of class, family, strata or religion they belonged to. Mothers were making every effort to either save the life of an ailing son or daughter or trying hard to counter the financial problems in order to secure a good future for their children. It also highlighted in cases as how ignorant and careless men are towards their responsibility of sharing the burden of upbringing a child with their wives.

The show
There were different outdoor segments. Sania travelled through different areas of Pakistan, visiting her mother in the final episode. A recruiting company was hired to go around cities and villages looking for cases of mothers who have faced hardship or sacrifices for their children. In the second segment, the host discussed culture and history of the village of the week, standing next to a landmark and then meeting that city's mothers on their doorsteps. In the last segment, during interviews on set, celebrities would remember their mothers.

Celebrities
 Salman Ahmad
 Ali Haider
 Marina Khan
 Anwar Maqsood
 Mahmood Ali
 Imran Aslam
 Ali Azmat
 Fatima Surayya Bajia
 Shagufta Ejaz
 Sajid Hasan
 Noman Ijaz
 Shabbir Jan
 Latif Kapadia
 Ardeshir Cowasjee
 Yasir Nawaz
 Arjumand Rahim
 Afshan Ahmed
 Behroze Sabzwari
 Tina Sani
 Jamal Shah
 Shafi Muhammad Shah
 Adnan Siddiqui
 Nida Yasir
 Sajjad Ali
 Jamshed Ansari
 Talat Hussain
 Savera Nadeem
 Humayun Saeed
 Sultana Siddiqui

Soundtrack

The theme song, Maa Jaise Hasti (English: Dear Mother...) was sung by Khalid Waheed, composed by Farrukh Abid and written by Mujeeb Syed.

Award
Ariel Mothers (Maa) won the National PTV Award in 2002 for the best programme in private productions.

See also
 Nestlé Nido Young Stars
 Nestlé Nesvita Women of Strength '09

References

External links
 
 Official Facebook page
 Bushra Ansari talking about Ariel Mothers
 Sania Saeed and Kamran Qureshi's mothers interview
 Kamran Qureshi talking about Ariel Mothers in live TV tramission
 Evergreen Media Europe

Pakistani television talk shows
PTV Award winners
Procter & Gamble